The following is a list of foreign Australian State League players.

Afghanistan

  Omid Popalzay
  Masood Hamdart
 Faisal Sakhizada

Argentina

 Nicolás Abot
 Nicolás Villafañe
 Marcos Flores
 Marcelo Carrusca
 Ignacio Sanchez-Contador

Bahrain

  Hakeem al-Araibi

Belgium

 Stéphane Van Der Heyden
  Mateusz Kuzmicki
 Nassim Coral

Bosnia and Herzegovina

 Nebojša Pejić

Brazil

 Oliver Minatel
 Meyer Carlos de Camargo Júnior
 Cristiano dos Santos Rodrigues
 Andrezinho
 Igor Ferreira Alves
 Renato De Vechhi
 Tiago Rodrigues
 Igor Sao Jose

Burkina Faso

 Germain Bationo

Cameroon

  Jean-Hugues Ateba

Canada

 Ethan Gage
 Ryan Fante
 Andrea Lombardo
 Zachary Sukunda
  Tomislav Ples
 Niko Giantsopoulos 
 Joe Zupo
 Shondell Busby
 Sherwin Emmanuel
 Daniel Kuczynski
 Gavin Hoy

Chile

 Carlos Espinoza
 Gianni Allebi
 José Guerrero del Solar
 Gonzalo Abascal

China

  Remy Cho

Colombia

 Gustavo Giron Marulanda
 Gilmar Girón Marulanda

Costa Rica

 Jean Carlos Solórzano

Croatia

 Mateo Poljak
 Davor Bajsić
 Velibor Mitrović
 Hrvoje Sibenik
 Anđelo Svalina

Czech Republic

 Jakub Sklenář
  Marek Mádle
 Zdenek Bezdek
 Zdeněk Koukal

Denmark

 Rasmus Festersen
 Kasper Holmbech
 Jonas Piechnik
 Dennis Nielsen
 Morten Levinsen
 Casper Andersen
 Jonas Baek 
 Mathias Waldmann

East Timor

  Alfredo Esteves

England

  Parys Okai

Equatorial Guinea

  Delfín Mosibe

Eritrea

  Alemayo Kebede
  Ambesager Yosief
  Samuel Tesfagabr
  Ermias Haile

Estonia

 Ivo-Henri Pikkor
 Kevin Ingermann
 Kevin Lutsokert

Fiji

 Esala Masi
 Veresa Toma

France

 Kevin Yann
 Thibault Marchal
 Nicolas Vandelli
  Bader Amellal
 Rayane Frihi
 Jean-Charles Dubois
 Alexandre Tabillon
 Niko Bechar
 Mehdi Martin
 Mathieu Sail
 Julien Chalet
 Maxime Hoppenot
 Yann Castrec

Germany

  Ali Parhizi
 Lucas Jester
 André Gumprecht
 Marko Kück
 Nino Lacagnina
 Florian Matk
 Arnold Suew
 Nils Mondré
 Emrah Bingöl

Ghana

  Lloyd Owusu
 Michael Mensah
 Moustapha Quaynor
  Togba Tarpeh

Greece

 Christos Intzidis
 Sotirios Kyrgiakos
 Michalis Karvouniaris
  Evangelos Skraparas
 Nikolaos Kalfas

Grenada

  David Cyrus

Guinea

 Ballamodou 'Balla' Conde

Guyana

  Adrian Butters

Iran

  Behzad Ariayee Ravesh

Italy

 Federico Brusacà
 Pietro Pegollo
 Emanuele Testardi
 Diego Pellegrini
 Nicola Gazzola
 Gianmarco Mancini
 Ivan D’ Adamo 
 Matteo Ballan 
 Carmine Pascarella
 Michele Crazi
 Luca Perico

Jamaica

  Trevor Benjamin
  Odaine Demar

Japan

 Hiroki Omori
 Takeru Okada
 Kojiro Kaimoto
 Shu Sasaki
 Keigo Moriyasu
 Yusuke Ueda
 Yūzō Tashiro
 Yohei Iwasaki
 Takuya Nozawa
 Masanari Omura
 Yuichi Yamauchi
 Kota Kawase
  Jin-ya Ahn 
 Kenya Takahashi
 Yuya Kuwata
 Shota Aizawa
 Futa Nakamura
 Chiharu Kosuge
 Kenya Takahashi
 Yuji Kin
 Hayato Yakamaru
 Shun Tokuno
 Yohei Matsumoto
 Jo Ichiguchi
 Hirofumi Kochi
 Kazuya Ito
 Ryota Nakaoka
 Satoru Okubo
 Shuto Kuboyama
 Tasuku Sekiya
 Tubas Sugaya
 Shimon Kato
 Masaki Nomoto
 Hayato Wakino
 Masato Mochizuki
 Yuta Konagaya
 Reo Morinaga
 Yuta Gonai
 Kosuke Mimaki
 Keita Furuie
 Yuya Samba
 Kosuke Kamada
 Kengo Tokushima
 Ryo Maekawa
 Ryo Watanabe
 Itsuki Hasegawa 
 Yuya Tamari
 Ryuji Miyazawa
 Hiroaki Kawasaki 
 Akiyoshi Saito
 Masakatsu Tanaka
 Kojiro Hori
 Tomohiro Shiozawa
 Sang-in Ko
 Shigeyuki Soga
 Tomohiro Kajiyama 
 Hiroto Tokuichi
 Shohei Arakawa 
 Kazuma Nagaishi 
 Ko Kurihara
 Ryo Kono
 Naoyuki Nomura
 Yotaro Hagiwara
 Akihito Shibao
 Mizuki Kimura
 Sota Kimura
 Genki Kohyama
 Rei Sohn
 Rentaro Osa
 Shinsei Tanaka
 Masahiro Aoki
 Hiroki Harashima 
 Toshimichi Naruse
 Meiji Tarutani
 Masahiro Wada
 Yu Takahashi 
 Tomohiro Kamon
 Daiki Sadahisa
 Haruki Nakano
 Kazuya Yamamoto
 Yuji Ina
 Shintaro Tagawa
 Ryo Miyamoto
 Ryuji Miyazaki
 Sho Katayama
 Toshihisa Saikawa
 Ryota Oketani
 Futo Ihara
 Daia Nakano
 Shin Takahashi 
 Yu Ito
 Taisei Aihara
 Hikaru Uneo
 Kanata Kojo
 Aoto Saito
 Kyoji Mori
 Takao Teramoto 
 Daisuke Sahashi
 Yasuto Onishi
 Shun Tokuno
 Motoki Kinjo
 Daisuke Yuzawa
 San-gyu Park
 Ryo Suzuki
 Yuya Kuwada
 Hironori Kobayashi
 Kazuhiro Obata
 Shohei Okuno
 Riku Iwauchi
 Daichi Murashita
 Sho Tadokoro
 Kotaro Higashi
 Yutaro Oda
 Tatsuya Sato
 Ryojiro Shimizu
 Nobuaki Mochizuki
 Takahiro Hidaka
 Naruyuki Kato
 Kei Mitani
 Junya Okamoto
 Yasufumi Miyamoto
 Keisuke Sato
 Jun Nishimuro
 Hiroki Makita
 Akira Tatsubayashi
 Yuki Kanno
 Hiroaki Kohinoki
 Takayuki Kayano
 Kohei Enokido
 Suguru Ieda
 Ryu Aminaka

Lebanon

 Fadi Ghoson
  Hamid Basma

Liberia

  Patrick Nyema Gerhardt

Lithuania

 Gediminas Krupa

Moldova

 Denis Ilescu

Nepal

 Jagajeet Shrestha
 Sulav Maskey

Netherlands

 Koen Bosma
 Jordy van de Corput
 Maarten Boddaert
 Michiel Hemmen
 André Krul
 Bobby Petta
 Davey van 't Schip
 Jip Bartels

Nigeria

 Kingsley Njoku
 Osagie Ederaro
 Lukmon Anifaloyin

North Macedonia

 Jurica Siljanoski
 Nikola Markovski
 Saso Aleksovski

Northern Ireland

  Bryan Gilfillan
 David Scullion

Papua New Guinea

 Reginald Davani
 David Muta
 Koriak Upaiga
 Cyril Muta
 Nathaniel Lepani
 Alex Davani
 Nigel Dabinyaba

Portugal

 Fábio Ferreira
 Reuben Tristao

Republic of the Congo

  Philtzgérald Mbaka

Republic of Ireland

 Brian Launders
 Alan Mulcahy
 Mark Leech
 Alan Kearney
 Patrick Sullivan
 John Fitzgerald
 Steven Gray
 Liam Kearney
 Kyle Moran
 Wayne O'Sullivan
 Tadhg Purcell
 Keith Shevlin
 Brian Farrell
 Timmy Purcell
 Michael Daly
 Paul McCarthy
 Kenny Keogh
 Johnny Perkins
 Cian Hirrell 
 Shane Cassidy
 David O'Leary

Romania

 Bogdan Nicolescu
 George Codrea

Rwanda

 Jean-Pierre Mabula Hakiri

Scotland

 Dean Brotherston
 Scott Wilson
 Grant Smith
 Stuart Kelly
 Christopher McLaughlin
 Liam Henderson
 Craig Sives
 Steven Weir
 Jon McShane
 Scott Muirhead
 Stuart McCluskey
 Nathan Shepherd
 Stuart Webster
 Ryan McGuffie
 Steven Campbell
 Gary Greenhill
 Stewart Petrie
 Gary Wales
 Kevin Moon
 Gordon Smith
 Sean Ellis
 Euen Grant
 Harry Monaghan
 Connor Campbell
 Stephen Skinner
 Gary McGowan
 Lewis Bonar
 Michael Ewen
 Chris Geddes
 Kieron Stallard
 Chris Boyle
 Greig Henslee
 Grant Mosson
 Jordan Lowdon
 Ritchie Davidson
 Daryl Nicol
 David Caine
 Andy MacAskill
 Aaron McKenna

Serbia

 Dejan Živković
 Vukašin Ristić

Singapore

 David Low

Slovakia

 Ondrej Holeva

Slovenia

 Andrej Rastovac
 Nace Kosmač
 Nik Oblak

Solomon Islands

 Benjamin Totori
 Alick Maemae
 Henry Fa'arodo

South Korea

 Gong O-kyun
 Gukhyeon Kim
 Chang Shin Park

Spain

 Álex Sánchez
 Jon Aurtenetxe
 Vitaka Rodríguez
 David Barca
 Manolo Padilla
 Raul Beneit Romero
 Juan Carlos Heras Romero
 David Araya
 Fernando Perez
 Alberto García Balta
 Alejandro Pastor Martínez
 Mauro Blanquer Reig
 Guillermo Lazcano

Sri Lanka

  Marvin Hamilton

Sweden

 Nichlas Schön

Switzerland

  Gabriele Mascazzini

Trinidad and Tobago

  Bradley Welch
 Akil Pompey

Tunisia

  Fahid Ben Khalfallah

Turkey

 Metekan Yilmaz

United States

  Alex Smith
 Patrick Hopkins
 Darius Madison
 Thomas Skara
 Garrett Matacale
 Austin Dunker
 Terence Carter
 Steffen Vroom
 Joel Caldwell
 Abdul-Azim 'Omar' Ismail 
 Kyle Luetkehans

Uruguay

 Sebastián Gallegos
 Fabricio Fernández

Wales

 Liam Hutchinson
 Mark Walton
 Ben Bowler
 Matthew Whatley
 Darren Griffiths 
 Jake Parry
 Daniel Sheehan
 Alex Barlow
 Luke Sherbon

Zambia

 Josam Muwowo

References

Soccer in Australia